New Hope Christian Fellowship is a Pentecostal church based in Honolulu, Hawaii. It is affiliated with the Foursquare Church. Started by Pastor Wayne Cordeiro in 1996, New Hope Christian Fellowship had approximately 21,000 attendees each week with five locations on Oahu, and more than 124 affiliate churches worldwide. New Hope International is the leadership training and church planting arm of New Hope.

History
Pastor Wayne Cordeiro (born on October 20, 1952, in Fort Belvoir, Virginia) and his wife Anna moved from Oregon to Hilo, Hawaii in 1983 and started a church in the Waiakea Villas area. It moved to the Hilo Women's Club and then to the Hilo Boy's and Girl's Club. In 1990, the "Gathering Place" facility was built, and the church grew to 2000.

In September 1995, Cordeiro and Anna moved to Honolulu, Hawaii to start New Hope. From 1996 to 2012, the church met in the auditorium of Farrington High School in the Kalihi neighborhood of Honolulu. Since 2013, the New Hope Ministry Center has been located at 290 Sand Island Access Road in Honolulu.

By 2005, the church had about 70 full and part-time staff and 1,500 volunteers.

Partnership with Farrington High School 
From 1996 to 2012, New Hope partnered with Farrington High School by renting its auditorium for its weekend services and by helping maintain the campus. The school was initially going to close its auditorium because it was run down and the school lacked the funds for repair. The church responded by installing air conditioning and a sound system, while volunteers painted the auditorium, gym, and several classrooms. Volunteers also helped perform custodial duties such as clearing trash and mowing the lawns on campus.

On Friday, November 23, 2012, Farrington's auditorium roof collapsed during a heavy rainstorm. The incident caused New Hope to relocate its services initially to Farrington's gymnasium for the remainder of 2012 and then, to its present location at Sand Island in January 2013.

In August 2013, three New Hope churches and two others were sued by a group alleging that the churches underpaid for the use of school facilities. The suit claimed that the five churches collectively underpaid by $5.6 million, of which New Hope Oahu alone was responsible for $3.2 million over the course of six years.

Views 
In 2013 New Hope Christian Fellowship was one of several Hawaiian churches to oppose a state law legalizing same-sex marriage.

Affiliations 
New Hope Christian College, formerly Eugene Bible College, is affiliated with the church and is located in Eugene, Oregon.

References

External links
New Hope's website

Pentecostal churches in Hawaii
Foursquare churches
Churches in Honolulu
Evangelical megachurches in the United States
Christian organizations established in 1996
1996 establishments in Hawaii
Megachurches in Hawaii